Joseph Deighton Gibson, Jr. (May 13, 1922 – January 30, 2000) was an American radio disc jockey and actor. He attended Lincoln University in Jefferson City, Missouri from 1940 to 1942, earning a bachelor's degree in science. He is regarded as the father of the Black appeal radio format.

To his peers in radio his nickname was “Jockey Jack,” and he achieved renown for his annual Black radio convention, where he was known as Jack the Rapper, for an all-inclusive Black/urban music showcase and convention. He is listed in the Nevada Broadcasters Association Hall of Fame. In 1989, he was inducted into the Black Radio Hall of Fame.

History

Gibson began his career in radio under the wing of Al Benson, one of radio’s legends, a jive-patter-talking disc jockey (DJ) of the Be-Bop school at Chicago’s WJJD.

Benson, the ‘Old Swingmaster’ (born Arthur Bernard Leaner in 1920 in Jackson, Mississippi) as he was known, had come to radio in 1943 as a pastor, but was prohibited from selling airtime, so he switched to become a secular DJ, and mentored some of the Black DJ’s at WGES and WJJD. He rapidly rose to fame in Chicago, Illinois playing swing and Be-Bop jazz. His phenomenal appeal was due to the Black jive talk he peppered between songs. He was the first DJ to speak with a Black southern accent, and frequently used ‘street slang’. He came to this by way of his previous employment with the Works Progress Administration as an interviewer. His bond with the Black migrants to northern cities was from his ‘mushmouth,’ as the first Black radio ‘personality jock.’ He was the first to play hit urban blues records on air, and with success at selling airtime, the station became immensely popular. When Jack Gibson came to work for him at WJJD a bell rang, and thus was born the idea of Black appeal radio. 'Jockey Jack' was born here. In publicity stills, Gibson was pictured straddling a microphone and turntable in jockey silk outfits, and he gained a following playing to a Black audience.

Also he had parts in the anthology Destination Freedom, a series written by Richard Durham, dedicated to the retelling the lives of notable Negros in the Americas. In 1949, Gibson left WJJD to found a new station, WERD in Atlanta, Georgia. WERD was the first radio station to be owned by a Black person, and the first voice heard on it was ‘Jockey Jack.’ He and Jesse Blayton Jr. flipped the switch on a money-losing big-band station. The station played the new Rhythm and Blues (R&B)—a mix of gospel vocal styles, swing-band instrumentals, and electrified urban blues which Benson had helped to popularize after WWII. R&B was outselling jazz in the Black music market but had little traction on-air as DJs at other Black-themed stations did not play it, preferring the then-popular big-band format. The use of ‘back home’ street patter and R&B music was popular with the youth culture and was considered ‘gangsta’ and a bit obscene. Along with other Benson-inspired DJ’s, a new wave of rhyming and signifying African-American culture hit American urban centers on air, with boastful patter, the ‘dozens,’ and rhyming at the end of sentences which became de jure. The first to do that was a former Negro League baseball announcer named Lavada Durst, known as Doctor Hep Cat, who spieled rhyme that was not obscene and was the precursor to modern rap and hip-hop. There was also Holmes (Daddy-O) Daylie, the rapping bartender who did his entire show in rhyme. Daddy-O was responsible for the Be-Bop revolution in jazz vernacular, creating a hipster idiom that Be-Bop artist Dizzy Gillespie credits for popularizing with modern jazz lovers in the 1950s and 1960s.

Rappers Delight

Jumpin’ jills and jivin' cats,

Upstate Gates in Stetson hats,

Lace your boots and tighten your wig,

Here’s some jive, can you dig?

I'm Doctor Hep Cat, on the scene,

With a stack of shellac in my record machine,

I'm hip to the tip, and bop to the top,

I'm long time coming and I just won't stop.

—Doctor Hep Cat, KVET Austin, 1948

Durst published a pamphlet called “The Jives of Doctor Hep Cat” which included his radio rhymes and a dictionary of “jive talk.” For much of the 1950s and well into the 1960s Doctor Hep Cat ruled the late-night in Austin, Texas. These DJs did not assimilate the culture; they were populists, broadcasting music and speech that Black folk used in the street. This set the stage for the birth of Black appeal radio stations in the post-war era of swing and Be-Bop. When Hal Jackson (Inner City Broadcasting Corporation head) entered mass-market radio he put his own stamp on Black radio, one that eschewed fast-talking jive, and with WWRL he found greater audiences broadcasting in the smoother patter of the inner city. When his station WLIB purchased WBLS and FM radio audiences came to understand there was more to music than top-40, disc jockeys like Frankie Crocker and his urban contemporary cohorts Johnny 'The Duke' Allen, Vaughn 'Quiet Storm' Harper, and Ken ‘Spider’ Webb went from just some ‘jive turkeys’ to number one in their market, then to the number-one radio station in the country.

Gibson was part of a generation of radio personalities who talked "jive" or the hip-speak of the day, offering colorful, jargon-filled and often-rhymed commentaries to the listening audience between record spins. They went by names like Tommy “Dr. Jive” Smalls, “Genial” Gene Potts, John “Honey Boy” Hardy, and “Long Tall Lanky Larry Dean.” Gibson would go on the air in his ‘Jockey Jack’ persona, wearing real silks, playing bugle calls from the track Kentucky-derby style, talking about ‘riding the hits.’ (During 1951–1953, both Gibson and Dean were working at WLOU Louisville, Kentucky, home of the Kentucky Derby.) The year 1953 found him as program director at WMBM, and then at WFEC. The following year he was back at WERD. WERD had its studios in the same building as the Southern Christian Leadership Conference, led by the Reverend Dr. Martin Luther King Jr. When King wanted to alert the masses about an upcoming rally, he would bang on the ceiling of his office, directly under WERD’s air studio. Responding to Dr. King's signal, Jack would lower his microphone through the studio window, down one flight to the SCLC window, where King would grab the mic to announce his calls to protest.

Mello Yello

In 1955, Gibson founded the National Association of Radio Announcers for Black DJs. In the 1960s it was renamed  the National Association of Television and Radio Announcers (NATRA). Bringing together disparate elements of Black Appeal Radio under one body placed Gibson at the head of the table, and as the father he declared, "I slapped this baby's bottom and brought it to life!"
 
In 1963 Gibson joined the staff of Motown records as a public-relations (PR) manager. While there, he mentored the Supremes, Marvin Gaye, The Jackson Five, and Stevie Wonder, and as Director of International PR, he often provided their first introductions to the public on stage. In 1969 he moved to STAX records, where he remained until 1972. In 1976 he began publication of a two-sided trade pamphlet called "Mello Yello," about the radio industry.

Gibson recounts in his autobiography, “When we went to get it copied, the man told us he could give us a good deal if we used this goldenrod paper stock, which was a sunshine-yellow. Guess he was overstocked with that color. I didn’t mind because, if nothing else, that wild color would get the newsletter noticed.”

"Jack the Rapper's Mello Yello" is the oldest and largest-circulated Black radio/music trade publication in America. As Gibson recounted, “I think I just called it the same thing I had called it at Stax—“Telling It Like It T-I-S-is!” And, of course, since I was rappin’ my ass off, as usual, I just kept going by “Jack the Rapper.” I did a pick of the week and rated the top singles and albums, but I added something new: I decided to run my own style of editorial pieces about the condition of the Black music industry. If there was somebody to be told on, I was ready and willing to do it. The ending line was always the same: “Stay Black till I get back.”

Family Affair

Gibson figured that he could build a Black music annual convention similar in structure to Billboard Magazine’s yearly confab, although with a different emphasis. The first “Jack the Rapper Family Affair” was scheduled at the Colony Square in Atlanta, Georgia in June 1977. It was set in what Gibson would always refer to as “Martin’s Town.” Major labels such as CBS Records provided sponsorship. There were seminars about radio programming and music production. Parties abounded. And amongst all of that, Minister Louis Farrakhan was one of the seminal Family Affair’s keynote speakers.

That first Family Affair was a big success, and along with Sidney Miller’s annual Black Radio Exclusive conference in Los Angeles, California, the Black music industry could rely on at least two opportunities to network, strategize, promote fellowship, and socialize. By the third year, the Family Affair had outgrown Colony Square, so it was moved to Peachtree Plaza in 1979 and 1980. That year, Gibson recounted in his autobiography, "We had a wild night with George Clinton and his Dr. Funkenstein act. Bob Marley was there, too. I believe it was his last appearance before his death. By 1981, we moved the convention to Dunphy’s and booked the entire hotel. Since Dunphy’s had a pool, we added a pool party to the convention schedule, and somebody sponsored that. It was at Dunphy’s that Eddie Murphy made an appearance at the Family Affair. After that we moved to the Marriot.In 1985 Gibson was involved with the effort to un-ban Stevie Wonder, whose records were banned in South Africa after his acceptance of an Academy award in the name of Nelson Mandela. Some 230 radio stations joined his call to salute the singer/songwriter on his birthday.Publisher bars South Africans from Music Gathering, The Orlando Sentinel 4/23/1985 p. 80

In 1986 Gibson was honored by the Smithsonian Institution for his work promoting Black radio.

In 1987, after learning that soul singer Jackie Wilson had been buried next to his mother in an unmarked grave, Gibson launched what is today known as a crowd-sourcing fundraiser for a marker and tomb for the pair. A prisoner in Kansas donated 50 cents, and by May donations were estimated at $10,000, often donated in $1 increments, to build a mausoleum and headstone with the inscription, "And now, no more lonely teardrops" for the singer.

The Jack the Rapper Family Affair was where influential people in Black urban radio gathered and listened to what record companies had to offer. Performing live could launch a new act's career, and affirmed the viability of older, established musicians like Prince and Whitney Houston.
When Rap emerged in the 1980s and 1990s, up-and-coming Rap acts flocked to the Family Affairs, confusing the name 'Jack the Rapper' and also attracting an element who caused hotel venues to rethink their relationship with Gibson's affairs.

Rap Wars

At the 1993 conference, Gibson recalled sitting on a panel discussion in a hotel parlor room, only to hear rumbling from one of the other rooms. A chair-throwing, fist-flying commotion had broken out at one of the rap industry panels. Rumors swirled that it was a manifestation of a growing war between camps representing Suge Knight’s Death Row Records and Luther Campbell’s Skyywalker Records.“I certainly didn’t want that violence any more than anybody else did. Many of my backers blamed me because I had refused to ban rappers from the convention. But how could I ban the rappers? They are just as viable as any other Black music, and I was not about to engage in some sort of modern-day segregation practice. I guess it was just one of those cases of having to pay for your beliefs. Well, I was paying, all right. I was flat on my ass.”Gibson relocated the 1994 Family Affair from Atlanta to Orlando, Florida to deter incidents that had marred recent conferences. It had grown to over 5,000 attendees and claimed an annual $13.8 million influx of business to Atlanta. People who wanted to hobnob with celebrities were buying tickets on-site to party, and these crowds overwhelmed the venues and organizers alike, as Jill Gibson-Bell, Gibson's daughter, recalled. A security issue also presented itself. Young, hustling entrepreneurs like Sean “Puffy” Combs and artists like Guru, Heavy D, Das Efx, and Redman were in active attendance that year. Some of the rough action that occurred in Orlando was documented in the 1997 Miramax film Rhyme & Reason, as recorded for a television news report. There were many talented artists who started at a Family Affair who developed into superstars. There were seminars that gave people in the industry an opportunity to exchange ideas, and they often returned to their jobs equipped with fresh concepts, ready to make changes. But the show was over, and extra security failed to secure the venue. It was killed by the very acts Gibson had defended who brought the street to the 'family friendly' upscale convention.

In 1996, the entirety of Gibson's books, records, and photographs was donated to the Archives of African American Music and Culture at Indiana University. That year Gibson also was named to the Entertainment Committee for the 1996 Olympic Games in Atlanta.

Gibson moved to Las Vegas, Nevada in 1990 and was inducted into the Nevada Broadcasting Hall of Fame in 1998.

 Personal life 
Gibson was married to Sadye Gibson for 47 years; they had two children. She died in 1990. His second wife, Elsie Harris-Gibson, currently resides in Las Vegas, Nevada.

Gibson died of prostate cancer on January 30, 2000, at age 79 in Las Vegas, Nevada.

See also

 Archives of African American Music and Culture
 African American firsts
 Imhotep Gary Byrd
 Kool DJ Red Alert
 Bob Perkins
 Jocko Henderson
 Ed Castleberry
 Yvonne Daniels
 DJ Nat D.
 Jive
 Signifying Jive talk

References

Further reading
 Black Radio in Los Angeles, Chicago & New York'' A Bibliography, Dr George Hill APR & JJ Johnson with foreword by Jack Gibson

External links
 
 
 

1920 births
2000 deaths
African-American journalists
20th-century American journalists
American male journalists
African-American radio personalities
American radio DJs
Lincoln University (Missouri) alumni
Radio personalities from Atlanta
Radio and television announcers
20th-century African-American people